State Route 681 (SR 681) is a  long east–west state highway in the southern portion of the U.S. state of Ohio.

Route description
SR 681 traverses southwestern Athens County and northern Meigs County.   There are no portions of SR 681 that are included within the National Highway System (NHS).  The NHS is a network of highways identified as being most important for the economy, mobility and defense of the country.

History
The SR 681 designation was applied in 1962.  Maintaining the same routing through Athens and Meigs Counties throughout its history, SR 681 replaced what was known as SR 680 prior to 1962.  This was done to coincide with the coming of the Interstate Highway System to Ohio, which included Interstate 680 (I-680) in the Youngstown area.  Ohio follows a standard that no numerical designation may be duplicated among Interstate, U.S. and Ohio state routes, so to avoid a conflict, SR 680 was re-numbered as SR 681.

Major intersections

References

681
681
681